Munster Rugby has a strong tradition of competitiveness against touring rugby teams. They have played the All Blacks, the national team of New Zealand, 8 times since 1905. In 1978, they became the first Irish team, including the Irish national team, to win a match in the history of competition between the countries, and remained the only Irish team to beat the All Blacks until the Irish national team defeated New Zealand in November 2016.

History of matches between Munster and New Zealand

1905

The 1905 Original All Blacks were the first New Zealand national rugby union team to tour outside Australasia. Captained by Irish born Dave Gallaher, they toured the British Isles, France, Ireland and the United States during 1905–06 and became known as "The Originals". Their match with Munster was played at Markets Field in Limerick on Tuesday 28 November and the touring side defeated Munster 33–0. The eight tries witnessed by the 3,000 strong crowd included a penalty try after Fred Roberts was tripped close to the line. Munster were captained by Basil Maclear.

Munster A. Quillinan, A. Newton, B. McLear, W.O Stokes, R.M McGrath, F. McQueen, J. O'Connor, J. Wallace, T.S Reeves, S.K Hosford, M. White, R. Welply, T. Acheson, T. Churchwarden.
New Zealand Booth, Smith, McGregor, Deans, Abbot, Mynott, Stead, Gillet, Newton, Tyler, Mackrell, Cunningham, Nicholson, McDonaldson, Glasgow, Roberts

1954
Between 1953 and 1954, New Zealand toured the British Isles, France and North America. They played Munster at the Mardyke in Cork, winning 6 - 3 on 13 January 1954 in front of a crowd of 7000 in cold and snowy conditions.

Munster B. G. M. Wood, D. Crowley, J. T. Clifford, J. S. McCarthy, T. E. Reid, M. Madden, B. Cussen, G. Reidy, J. A. O'Meara, D. Daly, N. Coleman, R. Godfrey, G. Kenny, B. Mullen, P. Berkery
New Zealand  C. A. Woods, I. J. Clarke, J. W. Kelly, K. L. Skinner, D. O. Oliver, G. N. Dalzell, K. P. Bagley, P. F. H. Jones, R. C. Stuart, V. D. Bevan, L. S. Haig, D. D. Wilson, J. T. Fitzgerald, J. M. Tanner, W. S. S. Freebairn

1963
In 1963, the All Blacks toured the British Isles, France and Canada. On 11 December that year, they beat Munster again by 6 - 3. The game was played at Thomond Park in Limerick in wet and windy conditions. New Zealand were captained by Ian Clarke.

 Munster T.J Kiernan, M. Lucey, J, Walsh, B. O'Brien, P. McGrath, M. English, N. Kavanagh, M. O'Callaghan, P. Lane, M. Carey, J. Murray, M. Spillane, D. Kiely, H. Wall, N. Murphy.
New Zealand M. A. Herewini, I. S. T. Smith, W. L. Davis, I. R. MacRae, B. A. Watt, E. W. Kirton, C. R. Laidlaw, B. J. Lochore, K. R. Tremain, A. J. Stewart, R. H. Horsley, K. E. Barry, I. J. Clarke, J. Major, J. M. Le Lievre

1973
In 1972 and 1973 New Zealand toured Britain, Ireland, France and North America. Munster drew 3-3 with them in Musgrave Park in Cork, on 16 January with the All Blacks only securing the draw with a penalty in the last minute of the game. New Zealand were captained by Alex Wyllie.

Munster T.J. Kiernan, J. Barry, S. Dennison, B. Bresnihan, P. Parfrey, B.J McGann, D. Canniffe, P.O'Callaghan, J. Leahy, K. Keyes, J. Madigan, M. Keane, C. Tucker, T. Moore, S. Deering.
New Zealand  T. J. Morris, B. G. Williams, G. R. Skudder, D. A. Hales, R. M. Parkinson, I.N. Stevens, G. L. Colling, A. R. Sutherland, A. J. Wyllie, A. M. Haden, I. M. Eliason, B. Holmes, K. K. Lambert, R. A. Urlich, A. L. R. McNicol

1974
In 1974 Munster played New Zealand in their tour of the British Isles with New Zealand winning 14 - 4 at Thomond Park, on 9 November in front of a crowd of 10800. New Zealand were captained by Andy Leslie.
Munster R. Spring, P. Parfrey, L. Moloney, J. Coleman, P. Lavery, B.J. McGann, D. Canniffe, O. Waldron, P. Whelan, P. O'Callaghan, J. Madigan, M. Keane, C. Tucker, T. Moore, S. Deering.
New Zealand K. J. Tanner, J. F. Karam, B. G. Williams, G. B. Batty B. J. Robertson, J. E. Morgan, D. J. Robertson, S. M. Going, A. R. Leslie, K. W. Stewart, H. H. Macdonald, P. J. Whiting, I. A. Kirkpatrick, A. J. Gardiner, R. W. Norton

1978
In 1978, New Zealand toured the northern hemisphere. In a highly successful tour the All Blacks won every match they played, bar one: the fixture against Munster.

Munster became the first Irish team to beat the All Blacks. The 12–0 victory took place on Tuesday 31 October 1978 at Thomond Park, in front of a crowd of 12,000. Munster were coached by former Ireland and British and Irish Lions captain Tom Kiernan. Kiernan, who had played in the 1963 and 1973 games against the All Blacks targeted the match. He ensured that Munster were physically fit and as part of his preparation, Munster undertook a two-match tour to London playing Middlesex and the Exiles, a team mainly made up of London Irish players.

Although Munster were not expected to win, Christy Cantillon scored a try with Tony Ward converting. Ward also adding a dropped goal in each half.  New Zealand were held scoreless with New Zealand wing Stu Wilson remarking afterwards that "We were lucky to get nil". Wilson likened the match to playing on front of a crowd of 100,000, such was the noise. Graham Mourie was the captain of the New Zealand team and Donal Canniffe captained Munster.

Munster G. A. McLoughlin, P. C. Whelan, L. White, M. I. Keane, B. Foley, C. Cantillon, C. Tucker, D. E. Spring, D. Canniffe, A. J. P. Ward, J. Bowen, G. Barrett, S. Dennison, M. Finn, L. A. Moloney
New Zealand  B. R. Johnstone, J. E. Black, G. A. Knight, F. J. Oliver, A. M. Haden, W. G. Graham, G. N. K. Mourie, A. A. McGregor, M. W. Donaldson, E. J. Dunn, B. G. Williams, J. L. Jaffray, B. J. Robertson, S. S. Wilson, B. J. McKechnie

1989
Munster played New Zealand who were reigning Rugby World Cup champions, having won the inaugural competition in 1987, in their 1989 tour at Musgrave Park, Cork, on 11 November 1989, losing 9 - 31.  The match had an attendance of 18,000 with Buck Shelford captaining the visitors.
Munster P. M. Clohessy, T. J. Kingston, J. J. Fitzgerald, M. J. Galwey, D. G. Lenihan, K. O'Connell, P. T. J. O'Hara, P. C. Collins, M. T. Bradley, R. P. Keyes, P. V. Murray, C. Murphy, M. J. Kiernan, J. Galvin, K. J. Murphy.
New Zealand R. O. Williams, S. B. T. Fitzpatrick, R. W. Loe, Z. V. Brooke, M. J. Pierce, S. B. Gordon, W. T. Shelford, G. T. M. Bachop, G. J. Fox, N. J. Schuster, J. T. Stanley, T. J. Wright, C. R. Innes, J. A. Gallagher.

2008

The All Blacks returned to Thomond Park on 18 November 2008, to commemorate the 30th anniversary of the 1978 game and to celebrate the opening of the new stadium. Four of the 1978 team, Graham Mourie, Bryan Williams, Mark Donaldson and Gary Knight were in the crowd for the occasion.  Prior to kick off, Munster's four New Zealand players, Rua Tipoki, Doug Howlett, Lifeimi Mafi and Jeremy Manning, challenged the All Blacks by performing the Haka first. Munster were without 10 of their squad who were on international duty and New Zealand chose to play an understrength team, resting key players for the forthcoming match against Ireland a few days later.

Munster almost repeated history, leading 16-10 at half time and after 76 minutes of the match were winning 16-13. The Munster try, scored by Barry Murphy in the first half, was the only one scored against New Zealand during their European leg of the 2008 end of year rugby tests.  A late try by Joe Rokocoko secured a win for the All Blacks with a final score 18-16.

Media reporting towards the match was extremely positive, commending the atmosphere, and the physical intensity of the Munster players. New Zealand coach Graham Henry said that the experience would help the development of many of the All Blacks who were young and inexperienced and might not have felt the sort of heat Munster and their crowd were able to generate.

Munster F. Pucciariello, F. Sheahan, T. Ryan, M. O'Driscoll, D. Ryan, J. Coughlan, N. Ronan, D. Leamy, P. A. Stringer, P. Warwick, I. Dowling, L. Mafi, R. Tipoki, B. Murphy, D. Howlett
Subs: D. Fogarty, T. Buckley, M. Melbourne, B. Holland, J. O'Sullivan, M. Prendergast, J. Manning
New Zealand J. L. Mackintosh, C. R. Flynn, B. J. Franks, A. J. Thomson, R. A. Filipo, J. J. Eaton, S. L. Waldrom, L. J. Messam, P. A. T. Weepu, I. Toeava, A. T. Tuitavake, J. T. Rokocoko, H. E. Gear, C. S. Jane. S. R. Donald.

2016: Māori All Blacks
Munster hosted the Māori All Blacks in a capped friendly in Thomond Park on 11 November 2016. Before kick-off, the Māori All Blacks captain, Ash Dixon, led a tribute to Munster's late head coach Anthony Foley by placing an All Blacks jersey with Foley's initials on the halfway line, before performing the haka and presenting the jersey to Foley's two sons.

In heavy rain, Munster began the match well, with Niall Scannell scoring the provinces first try in the 13th minute. However, the Māori All Blacks hit back with two tries in the space of two minutes, firstly from James Lowe in the 23rd minute and then from Ambrose Curtis in the 25th, with Otere Black converting both to give the Māori a 14–5 lead. Munster were awarded a penalty try in the 30th minute after Rory Scannell was tackled without the ball on the Māori try line, for which Reed Prinsep was sin-binned. Ian Keatley converted the try. 7 minutes later, Darren Sweetnam hacked the ball out of his own half and, displaying excellent ball control, kicked the ball into the Māori in-goal area to score a try. A failed conversion gave Munster a 17–14 half-time lead.

The home side scored first in the second-half, with Ian Keatley kicking a 43rd-minute penalty to extend Munster's lead. Despite Duncan Williams being shown a yellow card for a high tackle in the 45th minute, the Munster defence remained resolute and they maintained their assault on Māori territory, having a try ruled out by the TMO, before Ronan O'Mahony scored a try in the 67th minute, converted by Keatley, to give Munster a 27–14 lead heading into the final 10 minutes of the game, a lead they never relinquished, despite the Māori All Blacks fighting until the final whistle. Many of the crowd stayed after the end of the game, as both teams completed laps of honour after the memorable meeting of the two sides.

New Zealanders Rhys Marshall and Te Aihe Toma were in the Munster team, whilst John Foley and Seán O'Connor made their Munster debuts as replacements during the game. O'Connor had tasted victory against a New Zealand team before, having been part of the Ireland Under-20s team that beat New Zealand Under-20s at the 2016 World Rugby Under 20 Championship. Tommy O'Donnell captained Munster for the first time, and Robin Copeland won the Man-of-the-Match award.

Book, Play and Documentary on the 1978 game
A stage play named Alone it Stands by John Breen and a book named Stand Up and Fight: When Munster Beat the All Blacks by Alan English were both based on the events. Both have been commercially successful. Alone it Stands has had several sell-out runs in Ireland and has played in the Sydney Opera House and in Auckland. "Stand Up and Fight" was a bestseller in 2005.

Setanta Sports also produced a documentary called Alone It Stands: the documentary with excerpts from the play intercut with the first hand testimonies of the 1978 players.

Before the 2008 match, the All Blacks attended a production of the play to understand what the game meant to Munster supporters.

Munster players from New Zealand
A number of players from New Zealand have been involved with Munster over the years:

Rhys Ellison, who won over 20 caps for the Māori All Blacks.
Jason Holland, who qualified for Ireland and represented Ireland A
Christian Cullen, New Zealand's second-highest try scorer.
Jeremy Manning, born in Blenheim, New Zealand, though later qualified for Ireland.
Lifeimi Mafi, who played for Hurricanes, Manawatu, Taranaki and New Zealand Sevens.
Rua Tipoki, a former Māori All Blacks captain.
Doug Howlett, New Zealand's current all-time highest try scorer.
Nick Williams, who played for North Harbour, Blues and the Junior All Blacks
Toby Morland, who played for Otago, Highlanders, Chiefs, Blues, Auckland and Manawatu.
Sam Tuitupou, capped nine times by the All Blacks.
Savenaca Tokula, who played for New Zealand Sevens.
Casey Laulala, capped twice by the All Blacks.
Quentin MacDonald, who played for New Zealand Under-20s and Sevens.
Tyler Bleyendaal, who captained New Zealand Under-20s and qualified for Ireland in 2018.
Francis Saili, capped twice by the All Blacks.
Rhys Marshall, who played for New Zealand Under-20s and will qualify for Ireland in 2019.
Te Aihe Toma, who played for Bay of Plenty and Highlanders.
Alby Mathewson, capped five times by the All Blacks, including against Munster in 2008.

References

External links
Munster Rugby
All Blacks Rugby
Munster HAKA vs All Blacks HAKA 

New
New Zealand national rugby union team matches
Rugby union rivalries in New Zealand
Rugby union rivalries in Ireland